Timothy Daly is an Australian playwright, with many national and international productions to his credit.

His 2008 play Derrida in Love, was written for Jacki Weaver, which she performed in a sold out season at the Ensemble Theatre, Sydney. Daly's play Kafka Dances has won a dozen national and international awards since its premiere and is one of the most internationally performed Australian plays. His play Richard III (or almost) premiered at the 2011 Festival d'Avignon and followed with a Paris season in October–November 2012. Daly's play, The Man in the Attic, was awarded the Patrick White Playwrights' Award for best new play. It has been staged in Paris, at the 2013 Festival d'Avignon. In 2013, Daly was the recipient of a Paris Studio Residency Award from the Australian Council for the Arts.

Theatre 
 The Don's Last Innings (Sydney Theatre Company; Launceston Theatre Company; Riverina Theatre Company; State Theatre Company of South Australia)
 Derrida in Love (Ensemble Theatre)
 Kafka Dances (Griffin Theatre Company; Sydney Theatre Company; La Boite Theatre Company; Cherry Tree Theatre; Market Theatre; Zenith Theatre; High-Doh Theatre; Axis Theater; State Theatre Company of South Australia; Cyrano's Theater Company; Star Théâtre; Theatre des Opprimés; Théâtre de Chevilly-Larue; Comédie De l'Est; Saint-Cyr-l'École; Saint-Maur-des-Fossés;  Festival de Cornouaille; Festival d'Avignon and toured to Strasbourg; Valenciennes; Nîmes and Draveil)
 The Man in the Attic (Star Théâtre; Festival d'Avignon; Théatre l'Avant Seine; Théatre Bois de l'Épée)
 Beach: A Theatrical Fantasia (National Institute of Dramatic Art, graduation production commission)
 The Quiz King (New Theatre)
 The Critic Assassinated (National Institute of Dramatic Art; Mummers Theatre)
 The Moonwalkers (Griffin Theatre Company; Street Theatre Company)
 Complicity (Marian Street Theatre)
 The Private Visions of Gottfried Kellner (Griffin Theatre Company; Bakehouse Theatre, Adelaide)
 Livingstone (Marian Street Theatre; Ice House Theater; Effie Crump Theatre; Riverina Theatre Company; Brisbane Arts Theatre; Pymble Players and toured regionally to Kalgoorlie)

Television, translations and adaptations 
 Song For Two in the Night
 The Double Bass (Patrick Süskind) Ensemble Theatre 
 Liebelei (Flirtations) (Arthur Schnitzler) Australian Broadcasting Corporation
 Interior (Maurice Maeterlinck) Australian Broadcasting Corporation
 Hours of the Dying (Hans Johst) Australian Broadcasting Corporation
 Neighbours (various episodes, Grundy Corporation)
 A Lapse in Behaviour Australian Broadcasting Corporation; British Broadcasting Corporation; South African Broadcasting Corporation; New Zealand Broadcasting Corporation; Canadian Broadcasting Corporation

Opera librettos 
How to Kill Your Husband and Other Handy Household Hints (based on the novel by Kathy Lette; music by Alan John; produced by Victorian Opera)

Awards and prizes 
 The Man in the Attic – Winner of the Patrick White Award for Best New Play
 Kafka Dances – Winner of a Sydney Theatre Critics' award for Best New Australian Play; Finalist for both the New South Wales Premier's Literary Award and the Victorian Premier's Literary Award; Winner of 5 South African Vita (Now known as the Naledi Theatre Awards)
 Outlanders – Winner of Australian Writers Guild AWGIE Award
 The Private Visions of Gottfried Kellner – Winner of Australian Writers Guild AWGIE Award for Best Stage Play; finalist in the Victorian Premiers Literary Award for drama
 Three Australian Council for the Arts Literary Awards

Residencies and fellowships 
 Keesing Studio Residency Award (Paris) from the Australian Council for the Arts, 2013.
 Friends of the National Library Creative Arts Fellowship from the National Library of Australia, 2017, to progress a script for psychological thriller, Perfume.

References

External links
 Profile on Australian Plays

Living people
Year of birth missing (living people)
Australian dramatists and playwrights
Place of birth missing (living people)